Thomas Castro Ada (born 1949) is a former Democratic Party of Guam politician in Guam. Ada served as Majority Leader of the 34th Guam Legislature and Senator in the Guam Legislature for 10 terms.

Early life
Thomas Castro Ada was born in 1949.

Guam Legislature

Elections

Leadership positions

Committee leadership

Leadership positions

1998 gubernatorial campaign
In 1998, Ada teamed up with Senator Lourdes A. Leon Guerrero to run for Governor of Guam, as the "Tom and Lou" Team. Incumbent Governor Carl T.C. Gutierrez and incumbent Lieutenant Governor Madeleine Z. Bordallo were seeking reelection and were challenged by "Tom and Lou" and the team of Angel L.G. Santos and Jose T. "Pedo" Terlaje under the "HITA" slogan. The team of Gutierrez-Bordallo defeated both primary challengers with 16,838 votes, while "Tom and Lou" had 9,788 votes and the HITA team had 6,295 votes.

References

|-

1949 births
20th-century American politicians
Chamorro people
Guamanian Democrats
Guamanian people of Spanish descent
Guamanian Roman Catholics
Living people
Members of the Legislature of Guam